According to Spencer is a 2001 romantic comedy film directed by Shane Edelman and starring Jesse Bradford, Mia Kirshner, David Krumholtz, Adam Goldberg, and Brad Rowe.

Plot 
The film is centered on Spencer (Bradford), who moves to Los Angeles and (literally) runs into Melora (Kirshner), the girl he's been in love with since he was a child.  Spencer is plagued by many obstacles in his new life: winning the girl of his dreams, finding success in his new job, and dealing with his two ambiguously-oriented roommates (Krumholtz and Goldberg), who are obsessed with making a pornographic film and submitting it to what they believe is a contest.

Cast
 Jesse Bradford as Spencer
 Mia Kirshner as Melora
 David Krumholtz
 Adam Goldberg
 Kendall Schmidt

References

External links
 
 

2001 films
2001 romantic comedy films
American independent films
2000s English-language films
English-language German films
American romantic comedy films
Films set in Los Angeles
Films about pornography
German independent films
German romantic comedy films
2001 independent films
2000s American films
2000s German films